Reiichi (written: 礼一) is a masculine Japanese given name. Notable people with the name include:

 (born 1983), Japanese footballer
 (born 1967), Japanese Nordic combined skier

Japanese masculine given names